Iniistius geisha is a species of marine ray-finned fish from the family Labridae, the wrasses. It is found in the Western Central Pacific Ocean.

References

geisha
Taxa named by Chūichi Araga
Taxa named by Tetsuo Yoshino
Fish described in 1986